is a retired Japanese bantamweight freestyle wrestler. He won his event at the 1970 Asian Games, 1970 and 1971 world championships and 1972 Summer Olympics.

Life and career
He felt extremely pressured to perform well at the 1972 Olympics, and thus complained of an early burnout. He retired right after winning gold and became the coach of the national team in 1973 up until the 1976 Summer Olympics. He was then working in his home town for the family business (a liquor shop) and in 1983 was invited to coach the Korean national team up to the 1988 Summer Olympics. Since 1993, he has been coaching wrestlers in his home town. As a coach, he advised Mitsuru Sato who later won gold at the 1988 Olympics, to attend Nippon Sport Science University.

References

External links

1947 births
Living people
Olympic wrestlers of Japan
Wrestlers at the 1972 Summer Olympics
Japanese male sport wrestlers
Olympic gold medalists for Japan
Olympic medalists in wrestling
Asian Games medalists in wrestling
Wrestlers at the 1970 Asian Games
Medalists at the 1972 Summer Olympics
Asian Games gold medalists for Japan
Medalists at the 1970 Asian Games
20th-century Japanese people
21st-century Japanese people
World Wrestling Champions